North Hollywood Medical Center (Medical Center of North Hollywood) was a hospital, operating from 1952 to 1998, in the community of North Hollywood, a district in the San Fernando Valley region of the city of Los Angeles.

The hospital is famed as the filming location, from 2001 to 2008, of the multiple award-winning hospital comedy television show Scrubs.

Located at 12629 Riverside Drive, the building was demolished in mid-2011.  In February 2013, IMT Residential opened a new apartment complex on the site.

Medical Hospital
North Hollywood Medical Center was opened in 1952 as "Valley Doctors Hospital", a small private hospital with 160 beds and an emergency room.

The hospital was sold to Hyatt Medical and re-opened in 1973 as "Riverside Hospital", reflecting its location on Riverside Drive and beside the Los Angeles River.

In 1976, foreshadowing its future use as a permanent film set, Riverside Hospital was used to film scenes of the original TV movie of the "Having Babies" movie and series franchise.

The name was changed to "Medical Center of North Hollywood" following misplaced negative publicity caused in late 1981 when nurse Robert Diaz was charged with murdering 12 hospital patients in unrelated hospitals in Riverside County, California.<ref>"Nurse charged in hospital deaths", The Milwaukee Journal, November 24, 1981", p1</ref>

In 1997, North Hollywood Medical Center teamed with the USC University Hospital to operate a Family Practice Residency Program at North Hollywood.  The relationship was facilitated by the fact that both hospitals were then owned by Tenet Healthcare.

Citing reduced revenue streams, Tenet Healthcare closed North Hollywood Medical Center in August 1998.

Filming location of Scrubs
The building was the filming location of the NBC/ABC sitcom Scrubs for the first eight seasons (2001 through 2009) of the show, where it was called Sacred Heart Hospital.

The building required extensive reconstruction before it could be used as the Scrubs location. The reconstruction included production offices and dressing rooms on the third floor.

The series' lead actor, Zach Braff, commented on DVD audio commentary that the hospital still received patients in the lobby asking for medical advice, believing the hospital was still running due to the ambulances parked as props outside. On another DVD commentary, Sarah Chalke recalled having a man and his wife show up looking for medical help. She remembered that the man's arm was bloody and there was nothing anybody could do except direct the couple to a real hospital.

Season 9 was set in a new medical school facility, for which a stage set at Culver Studios was used. In the show, Sacred Heart Hospital was said to have been torn down and re-built on the "Winston University" campus.

Other roles in film and television
Other than being used in Scrubs, the building was featured repeatedly as the hospital in the 2001 film The One, starring Jet Li.  The center was used to film an advertisement for Communities In Schools. It also served as the filming location of the hospital-drama Diagnosis X, which featured doctors acting out their most unusual cases. The hospital can be seen from the outside in the Britney Spears movie Crossroads, where it played the hospital her friend Mimi ended up in after losing her baby.

The hospital has also been used in the following:The Sessions, Helen Hunt MovieCharmed, The WB supernatural dramaThe Sopranos, HBO dramaChildrens Hospital, Adult Swim comedyChuck, NBC comedy-dramaCrossroads, Britney Spears dramaEli Stone, ABC comedy-dramaThe Forgotten, ABC dramaThe Office (US version), NBC sitcomThe One, Jet Li actionParenthood, NBC comedy-dramaThree Rivers, CBS dramaWorst Week, CBS sitcomUnited States of Tara, Showtime comedy-drama
 Death Valley (TV series), Black comedy, Comedy horrorSix Feet Under, HBO dramaFreaks and Geeks, NBC comedy-dramaMalcolm in the Middle'', FOX comedy
"The Craiglist Killer" , Lifetime

Demolition

The building was scheduled to be demolished in 2011. On July 19, 2011, a fire was reported during the demolition of the building and quickly extinguished by the Los Angeles fire department. Welders removing part of the roof inadvertently dropped hot steel scraps down an elevator shaft, where debris caught fire. According to fire officials, there were no injuries, and no monetary loss as the building was already under demolition.

References

Hospital buildings completed in 1952
Defunct hospitals in California
Hospitals disestablished in 1998
Hospitals in Los Angeles
Scrubs (TV series)
North Hollywood, Los Angeles
Buildings and structures demolished in 2011
1952 establishments in California
1998 disestablishments in California
Hospitals established in 1952